Margate Lighthouse is a lighthouse on the end of Margate harbour arm in Kent.

1828 lighthouse
This lighthouse was designed by the architect William Edmunds and was completed in 1829. It was destroyed in the North Sea flood of 1953. The design was a round Doric column similar to the lighthouse at Whitby.

1955 lighthouse

A replacement lighthouse with an octagonal column was built in 1955. This lighthouse features on the series G Bank of England £20 note along with the Turner Contemporary.

References

Lighthouses completed in 1828
Lighthouses in Kent
Margate